Corey Allen Pavin (born November 16, 1959) is an American professional golfer who has played on the PGA Tour and currently on the PGA Tour Champions. He spent over 150 weeks in the top 10 of the Official World Golf Ranking between 1986 and 1997 and achieved his highest world ranking of No. 2 in June 1996.

Pavin won 15 events on the PGA Tour, was 1991 Player of the Year (topping that season's money list) and achieved one major championship victory, the 1995 U.S. Open. He finished in the top-5 on the money list in 1991, 1992, and 1995. Pavin has also won six official professional golf events internationally, on several different golf tours, making him a winner on five continents (North America, Africa, Europe, Asia and Oceania).

Early life 
Pavin was born in Oxnard, California, the son of Barbara and Jack Pavin. He attended Oxnard High School.

Amateur career
He then attended the University of California, Los Angeles (UCLA). He won two gold medals at the 1981 Maccabiah Games, the Jewish Olympics in Israel. He turned professional the following year.

Professional career
He quickly established himself as a professional, with three international victories in 1983. Playing 10 events on the 1983 European Tour, much fewer than all top European players that year, he finished 13th on the Order of Merit. After finishing lone 3rd, behind Sam Torrance and Craig Stadler, at the Scandinavian Enterprise Open in the beginning of July, Pavin won the German Open less than a month later, three strokes ahead of joint runner-up Seve Ballesteros, who at the time was the recent winner of The Masters Tournament. Pavin did not return to defend his German Open title the year after.

Pavin's first PGA Tour victory came at the 1984 Houston Coca-Cola Open. He won at least one event on either the PGA Tour or the international tour nearly every year for the next decade, and topped the PGA Tour's money list in 1991, when he was the last man to achieve this without winning at least one million dollars in prize money. Pavin's success culminated in his only major victory, the 1995 U.S. Open at Shinnecock Hills Golf Club in Southampton, New York, Pavin went into the final round three strokes behind Greg Norman and Tom Lehman. On the 72nd and final hole of the tournament, a 450 yards long par 4, Pavin produced a four wood, considered one of the great shots in U.S. Open history, 228 yards to five feet of the hole to secure the title.

Rather than marking a move to a new level of achievement, however, this was soon followed by a long slide down the world rankings from a high ranking of 2nd. After Pavin won the Bank of America Colonial in 1996, he did not win another PGA Tour tournament for ten years. His 89th-place finish on the 2004 money list was the first time he had made the top one hundred since 1998. Pavin finally won his 15th career title in 2006 at the U.S. Bank Championship in Milwaukee, ending a streak of 242 consecutive tournaments without a win.

Pavin played on three Ryder Cup teams: 1991, 1993, and 1995.

In 2002 he was named to the Ventura County Sports Hall of Fame.

On July 27, 2006, during the first round of what would become his 15th tour title, Pavin broke the record for the fewest strokes needed to complete nine holes at a PGA Tour event, with an 8-under par score of 26. The previous record of 27 strokes was held by Mike Souchak, Andy North, Billy Mayfair and Robert Gamez, with Mayfair and Gamez' scores being 9-under par. His 36-hole total of 125 also tied the record for fewest shots taken in the first 36 holes of a PGA Tour event held by Tom Lehman, Mark Calcavecchia, and Tiger Woods.

After acting as an assistant to U.S. Ryder Cup captain Tom Lehman in 2006, Pavin was in December 2008 by the PGA of America, named captain for the U.S. team at the 2010 Ryder Cup at the Celtic Manor Resort in Newport, Wales. In October 2010, the U.S. Ryder Cup team lost 13½ to 14½, against the European side.

Pavin began playing on the Champions Tour in 2010. In June 2010, he lost in a sudden death playoff to Bubba Watson at the Travelers Championship on the PGA Tour. In his 35th start, Pavin won his maiden Champions Tour event in February 2012 at the Allianz Championship. He defeated Peter Senior at the first sudden death playoff hole with a birdie to take the title, after having finished regulation play at 11 under.

Personal life
Pavin was married to Shannon Healy, with whom he has two children. He married Lisa Nguyen in 2003.

He was the only top Jewish player on the tour until 1991. In that year, he converted to Christianity. He was named the 117th-greatest Jewish athlete in the 2007 book The Big Book of Jewish Sports Heroes by Peter S. Horvitz.

Pavin is a Republican. During the 1993 Ryder Cup, Pavin was originally unwilling to meet with president Bill Clinton before the cup owing to their differing political views. Pavin stated that he had voted for Bush, and so was not particularly excited at the prospect of meeting Clinton.

Pavin made a cameo appearance playing himself in the 1996 movie Tin Cup starring Kevin Costner. In the movie, Pavin tells Fred Couples, "It's hard to believe that a guy named 'Tin Cup' might have his name beneath mine on the trophy."

Baseball player Pavin Smith is named after Pavin. Smith is the son of Pavin's agent.

Amateur wins
1981 North and South Amateur

Professional wins (28)

PGA Tour wins (15)

PGA Tour playoff record (5–4)

European Tour wins (2)

Japan Golf Tour wins (2)

Sunshine Tour wins (1)

PGA Tour of Australasia wins (2)

PGA Tour of Australasia playoff record (0–1)

Asia Golf Circuit wins (1)

Other wins (5)
1983 Calberson Classic (Europe – not a European Tour event)
1993 Toyota World Match Play Championship (Europe – then an unofficial event).
1995 Nedbank Million Dollar Challenge (South Africa – unofficial event)
1996 Ssang Yong International Challenge (South Korea)
1999 Martel Skins Game (Taiwan)

Champions Tour wins (1)

Champions Tour playoff record (1–1)

Major championships

Wins (1)

Results timeline

CUT = missed the half way cut
"T" indicates a tie for a place.

Summary

Most consecutive cuts made – 7 (1984 Open Championship – 1986 Masters)
Longest streak of top-10s – 2 (1995 U.S. Open – 1995 Open Championship)

Results in The Players Championship

CUT = missed the halfway cut
"T" indicates a tie for a place

Results in World Golf Championships

"T" = Tied

U.S. national team appearances
Amateur
Walker Cup: 1981 (winners)

Professional
USA vs. Japan: 1982
Nissan Cup: 1985 (winners)
Ryder Cup: 1991 (winners), 1993 (winners), 1995, 2010 (non-playing captain)
Presidents Cup: 1994 (winners), 1996 (winners)

See also
1983 PGA Tour Qualifying School graduates
List of Jewish golfers

References

External links

American male golfers
UCLA Bruins men's golfers
PGA Tour golfers
PGA Tour Champions golfers
Winners of men's major golf championships
Ryder Cup competitors for the United States
Golfers from California
Golfers from Dallas
Jewish golfers
Maccabiah Games gold medalists for the United States
Maccabiah Games medalists in golf
Competitors at the 1981 Maccabiah Games
Jewish American sportspeople
Sportspeople from Oxnard, California
Sportspeople from Ventura County, California
Golf writers and broadcasters
1959 births
Living people
21st-century American Jews